Emerald Cruises is a cruise line headquartered in Zug, Switzerland., formerly known as the river cruise line Emerald Waterways and ocean yacht service Emerald Yacht Cruises, and part of the Scenic Group.

History
Emerald Waterways was founded in 2013 by Glen Moroney, as a division of Scenic. It offered its first cruises on the rivers of Europe in 2014 on the 180-passenger Emerald Sky.

In 2018, the company announced its first non-European ship, the 84-passenger Emerald Harmony, to provide cruises between Ho Chi Minh City, Vietnam and Siem Reap, Cambodia. It also announced its expansion into yacht cruising, chartering the MV Adriatic Princess to offer cruises on Croatia's Dalmatian coast on the Adriatic Sea.

In February 2020, Emerald Cruises became the umbrella brand for Emerald Waterways and Emerald Yacht Cruises, a new ocean cruise line. In addition, it announced an upcoming launch of Emerald Azzurra, the first ship launched by Emerald Yacht Cruises, providing ocean cruises to the Adriatic, Mediterranean and Red Sea.

Fleet 

Emerald Cruises operates eight river ships, one yacht, two chartered river ships, and two chartered yachts. Emerald Azzura delivered in February 2022 with starts in Jordan.

Owned

Chartered

References

External links 

 

River cruise companies
British companies established in 2013